Annona stenophylla is a species of plant in the family Annonaceae. It is native to Tanzania and Zambia.

Description
It is a bush 0.3 to 1 meters in height. Its membranous, narrow leaves are 4-18 by 1-6 centimeters.  The tips of its leaves can come to a point, be rounded, or be slightly indented.  Its leaves are hairless and blueish green on their upper surface and have paler lower surface covered in dense, fine hairs. Its leaves have 5-7 orange to red secondary veins emanating from either side of their midribs. Its petioles are 0.8-10 millimeters long and have a groove. Its solitary flowers are on hairy, extra-axillary pedicels that are 0.8-2.5 centimeters long.  The peduncles are covered in fine woolly hairs. Its triangular sepals are 2.5-3 by 3-4 millimeters.  The outer surface of the sepals are covered in woolly hairs and their inner surface is hairless. Its flowers have two rows of petals. The thick, leathery, oval to triangular, green outer petals are 0.8-1 by 0.8-1.2 centimeters.  The concave outer petals come to a shallow point at their tips and are concave and are covered in dense fine hairs on their outer surface. Its oblong, narrow inner petals are 6-10 by 1.5-2.5 millimeters and hairless. Its stamens are 1.5-2 millimeters long.  The tissue connecting the lobes of the anthers overgrows to form a cap. Its cylindrical carpels are 1-1.5 millimeters long and hairless. Its fruit are on 1.5-4 centimeter long, hairy pedicels. Its fruit are dark yellow, oval to round, 1.7-3 centimeters in diameter, hairless and have an outer surface that has a network pattern. Its numerous seeds are brown, oval, flat and 7-9 by 3-4 millimeters with a caruncle at one end.

Reproductive biology
The pollen of A. stenophylla  is shed as permanent tetrads.

Habitat and distribution
It grows on sandy soil. It has been observed growing at elevations of 1200 to 1500 meters.

Uses
A paste of the roots is used in traditional medicine in Zimbabwe to treat Sexually transmitted infections and as a snake repellant. Bioactive molecules extracted from the bark of the root are reported to have hypoglycemic activity in diabetic mice.

The pulp of the ripe fruit is edible, with a sweet and pleasant taste. It is sought after for eating out of hand and also pressing for juice.

References

External links
Occurrence data map for Annona stenophylla Engl. & Diels (GBIF)

stenophylla
Flora of Tanzania
Flora of Zambia
Traditional African medicine
Plants described in 1901
Taxa named by Adolf Engler
Taxa named by Ludwig Diels
Fruits originating in Africa